Philip Charles Wilkins (January 27, 1913 – July 8, 1998) was a United States district judge of the United States District Court for the Eastern District of California.

Education and career

Born in Sacramento, California, Wilkins received a Bachelor of Laws from the University of California, Hastings College of the Law in 1939. He was in private practice in Sacramento from 1940 to 1942. He was a United States Naval Reserve Lieutenant during World War II, from 1942 to 1945. He was in private practice in Sacramento from 1946 to 1969.

Federal judicial service

Wilkins was nominated by President Richard Nixon on October 23, 1969, to a seat on the United States District Court for the Eastern District of California vacated by Judge Sherrill Halbert. He was confirmed by the United States Senate on December 17, 1969, and received his commission on December 18, 1969. He served as Chief Judge from 1979 to 1983. He assumed senior status on January 27, 1983. Wilkins served in that capacity until his death on July 8, 1998, in Sacramento.

References

Sources
 

1913 births
1998 deaths
Judges of the United States District Court for the Eastern District of California
United States district court judges appointed by Richard Nixon
20th-century American judges
University of California, Hastings College of the Law alumni
United States Navy officers